Edward Kaźmierski (1 October 1919 – 24 August 1942) was a Polish Roman Catholic anti-Nazi resistance fighter. He was born in Poznan. He was one of the "Poznań Five", who were guillotined in a prison in Dresden for their spiritual work and resistance against the Nazi occupation. He is one of the 108 Martyrs of World War II who were beatified by Pope John Paul II in 1999.

Bibliography
 Marian Orłoń, Wierni do końca, Łódź Wydawnictwo Salezjańskie: nakł. Salezjańskiej Inspektorii św. Stanisława Kostki, 1984
 Polska edycja Il Bollettino Salesiano - Magazyn Salezjański Don Bosco nr 7-8/2002

See also 
The Holocaust in Poland
World War II casualties of Poland

References

1919 births
1942 deaths
108 Blessed Polish Martyrs
People executed by decapitation
Christian martyrs executed by decapitation
Polish resistance members of World War II